The Gyoha No clan is a Korean clan. Its bon-gwan is Paju, Gyeonggi Province. According to census research in 2015, the number of Gyoha No clan members was 61,747. No O was dispatched to Silla while he was a scholar at the Hanlin Academy in T'ang China.

See also 
 Korean clan names of foreign origin

References

External links 
 

 
Korean clan names of Chinese origin